Burrium was a legionary fortress in the Roman province of Britannia Superior or Roman Britain. Its remains today lie beneath the town of Usk in Monmouthshire, south east Wales.

The Romans founded the  fortress around AD 55, probably for the Legio XX Valeria Victrix (20th Legion) and perhaps an additional ala of 500 cavalrymen. Earth and timber defences surrounded a number of legionary barracks. The fort was key to the conquest of the Silures, a tribe very resistant to the imposition of Roman rule in Roman Wales, but in AD 66, the legion was transferred to Viroconium Cornoviorum (at Wroxeter) and their base in Wales was largely abandoned. It was briefly replaced by a works depot for iron working. The surrounding vicus seems not to have developed into a small town, although it may have had an official mansio.

References

External links 
Roman Britain on Burrium
National Museum of Wales on Burrium

Roman fortifications in Monmouthshire
Archaeological sites in Monmouthshire
Usk
Roman legionary fortresses in Wales